Cinema of Colombia refers to the film industry based in Colombia. Colombian cinema began in 1897 and has included silent films, animated films and internationally acclaimed films. Government support included an effort in the 1970s to develop the state-owned Cinematographic Development Company (Compañía de Fomento Cinematográfico FOCINE) which helped produce some films yet struggled to stay financially viable. FOCINE went defunct in 1993. In 1997 the Colombian congress approved Law 397 of Article 46 or the General Law of Culture with the purpose of supporting the development of the Colombian film industry by creating a film promotion mixed fund called Corporación PROIMAGENES en Movimiento (PROIMAGES in Motion Corporation). In 2003 Congress also approved the Law of Cinema which helped to restart the cinematographic industry in Colombia.

History 

The history of Colombian cinema started in 1897 when the first Cinématographe arrived in the country, two years after the invention of cinematography by Auguste and Louis Lumière in Paris. The cinématographe was first demonstrated in the port city of Colón (in what today is Panama but was then part of Colombia), Barranquilla, Bucaramanga and later arrived to the capital city of Colombia, Bogotá, where in August of that same year the cinématographe was presented in the Municipal Theater (later demolished).

First years 
Soon after the introduction of the cinématographe in Colombia, the country entered a civil war known as the Thousand Days' War causing the suspension of all film production. The first films usually portrayed nature and moments of everyday Colombian life. The exhibition of these films was dominated by the Di Domenico brothers who owned the Salón Olympia in Bogotá. The Di Domenico brothers also produced the first documentary film in Colombia called El drama del quince de Octubre (The Drama of 15 October) which was intended to celebrate the centenary of the Battle of Boyacá and also narrated the assassination of General Rafael Uribe Uribe, provoking controversy upon its release.

Silent films 

During the early years of Colombian cinema producers almost exclusively portrayed nature and everyday life in their films until 1922, when the first narrative fiction film appeared, titled María (of which no complete copies remain). The film was directed by Máximo Calvo Olmedo, a Spanish immigrant who worked as a film distributor in Panama. He was hired to travel to the city of Cali, where he would direct and manage the photography of this film based on Jorge Isaacs' novel María.

Another pioneer of Colombian cinema was Arturo Acevedo Vallarino, a producer and theater director from Antioquia who lived in Bogotá. After the introduction of foreign films and the fascination they caused in Colombia, theaters no longer were as profitable as they once were, so Acevedo decided to found a film production company called Acevedo e Hijos (Acevedo and Sons). Acevedo and Sons was the longest lasting production company in Colombia, in business from 1923 to 1946, and the only one to survive the Great Depression of the 1930s. Acevedo and Sons produced the films La tragedia del silencio (The Tragedy of Silence) in 1924 and Bajo el Cielo Antioqueño (Under the Sky of Antioquia) in 1928. Under the Sky of Antioquia was financed by local magnate Gonzalo Mejía. The film was criticized for being elitist, but received an unexpectedly positive acceptance from the moviegoing public. Films in Colombia continued to be largely based on themes of nature, folklore, and nationalism, but some literary adaptations were exceptions. In 1926 the film Garras de oro: The Dawn of Justice (Claws of Gold; the title is half Spanish and English) was released. It is distinctive for being based on a political issue, the separation of Panama from Colombia, and for criticizing the role of the United States in the conflict, both bold firsts in Colombian cinema.

1930s crisis 

In 1928 the Colombian company Cine Colombia purchased the Di Domenico film studios, which commercialized international films because of the great profits they promised. The Colombian public of the time preferred international films to Colombian ones. As a result, from 1928 until 1940 only one feature-length sound film was produced in Colombia: Al son de las guitarras (To the Rhythm of the Guitars) by Alberto Santa, which was never shown in theaters. Colombians were more interested in Hollywood films. Colombian film industry enthusiasts did not have the money, technology or preparation needed to develop a national cinema. While Colombian movies were still silent, the international industry was already exploiting color and sound films, thus putting the Colombian cinema at a considerable disadvantage.

In the 1940s a businessman from Bogotá called Oswaldo Duperly founded Ducrane Films and produced numerous films despite facing strong competition from Argentine and Mexican cinema, which after 1931 became the third most preferred choice of Colombians. The only production company that survived during this period was Acevedo and Sons, until it closed in 1945.

During the 1950s Gabriel García Márquez and Enrique Grau attempted to restart the industry. In 1954 the two artists, a writer and a painter respectively, created the surrealistic short film La langosta azul (The Blue Lobster). García Márquez continued in the industry as a scriptwriter while Grau continued painting.

'Pornomiseria' cinema 

Pornomiseria cinema was the term used by Colombian critics in the 1970s to name certain films that exploited poverty and human misery, in order to make money and achieve international recognition for their directors. The term "pornomiseria" was coined by the Argentine director Luis Puenzo to criticize over-representation of marginalized lives in Latin American cinema. (See also Misery porn or Poverty porn for parallel phenomena.) 

One of the most criticized examples was Gamín (1978) by Ciro Durán, a documentary about children living on the streets. The film went beyond simply depicting urban poverty by staging recreated scenes of, for example, children stealing car radios. Among the loudest critics were the filmmakers Carlos Mayolo and Luis Ospina, leaders of the Grupo de Cali. Among other films they made was the mockumentary Agarrando pueblo (1977), a satire of pornomiseria cinema.

Cinematic Development Company (FOCINE) 
On July 28, 1978 the Compañía de Fomento Cinematográfico (FOCINE) (Cinematic Development Company) was established to administer the Fund for Cinematic Development which had been created a year before, in 1977. FOCINE was first adjudicated to the Colombian Ministry of Communications which in a period of ten years supported 29 films and a number of short films and documentaries. Corruption in its administration led to the closing of FOCINE in 1993. During this period, the work of Carlos Mayolo transcended and introduced new forms of film making into Colombian cinema with the exploration of unconventional languages. Gustavo Nieto Roa helped to develop comedies with an influence from Mexican cinema.

During the last decade of the 20th century, the Colombian government liquidated FOCINE forcing film makers to co-produce films with other countries, mainly from Europe and private capital investors. Despite this, some important productions developed, such as La estrategia del caracol (The Snail's Strategy) by Sergio Cabrera, which won numerous international prizes and managed to revive a national interest on national films. Another successful film director and producer was Víctor Gaviria who, with themes of social concern, created  La vendedora de rosas (The Rose Seller) which won many prizes and much recognition along with Bolívar soy yo (I Am Bolívar, 2002) by Jorge Alí Triana.

Law of Cinema 
In 2003, the Colombian government passed the Law of Cinema, which standardized help for local film production. Numerous films were sponsored by the government generating a success in the local box office such as Soñar no Cuesta Nada (Dreaming Costs Nothing) by Rodrigo Triana, with 1,200,000 spectators, an unprecedented attendance at the time, or the film El Colombian Dream (the last word being in English to highlight a play on the concept of the "American Dream") by Felipe Aljure, which achieved technical innovations and employed a narrative never before seen in Colombian cinema.

Law 814 of 2003, also known as the Law of Cinema, was approved after a second debate in the Colombian senate. The senate established the funding of Colombian cinema through taxes collected from distributors, exhibitors and film producers. The collection was set up to be destined to support film producers, short films documentaries and public projects. Funds collected are administered by the PROIMAGENES Cinematographic Production Mixed Fund.

During the second term of President Álvaro Uribe Vélez the government presented a tax reform to cut funding to the Law of Cinema. The president was criticized for this, but the minister of Culture, Elvira Cuervo de Jaramillo, lobbied in the Ministry of Finance to impede this law from affecting the financial resources destined to Colombian cinema. The Minister of Finance agreed to protect the benefits for the film industry.

International projection 
Despite Colombian cinema having had a very small presence in international events, some documentaries during the 1970s had relative success, such as "Chircales" (1972) by Marta Rodríguez and Jorge Silva, which won international prizes and recognition.

During the 1990s Silva gained notoriety with the film La estrategia del caracol (The Strategy of the Snail) and Víctor Gaviria did so with his films Rodrigo D: No futuro (1990) and La vendedora de rosas (1998), which was nominated for a Palme d'Or at the Cannes Film Festival.

In the 2000s (decade) actress Catalina Sandino Moreno was nominated for an Academy Award for her acting in the Colombian American production Maria Full of Grace. Moreno was also nominated for best female acting at the Berlin International Film Festival in 2004 and won, sharing it with actress Charlize Theron.

Documentary films 
Documentary productions in Colombia have varied in quality.  Nevertheless, they have not seen wide distribution due to barriers which the film industry imposes regarding exhibition and distribution of material.  Viewers interested in approaching these audiovisual materials are rare.

During the 1970s, in the city of Cali there was a great boom not only in film but in the arts in general.  At that time the Grupo de Cali was formed, which would include Carlos Mayolo, Luis Ospina, Andrés Caicedo, Oscar Campo and other documentarists and directors who portrayed a particular sense of place and reality through their work. At the same time, documentarists like Marta Rodríguez and Jorge Silva produced a seemingly unending array of documentaries that approached anthropology, portraying forms of life and realities unknown to many.

Animated film 
The development of animated film in Colombia, as in the rest of Latin America, has been slow and irregular, and it is only in recent years that animation has begun to gain importance. The first initiatives in the country were around the 1970s, especially in the production of television commercials. Nonetheless, it was at the end of the past decade that Fernando Laverde, considered the pioneer of stop motion animation in Colombia, used experimental methods and limited resources to create short animated pieces that received national and international recognition. Bogota native Carlos Santa explored the world of animated film as fine arts and is considered the father of experimental animation in Colombia. In 1988 with the support of FOCINE, Santa released his film El pasajero de la noche (The Passenger of the Night) and in 1994 La selva oscura (The Dark Jungle) at the Caracas Film Festival. Both films received critical recognition for their artistic and narrative merits. In 2010, Carlos Santa completed his first feature-length animated film "Los Extraños Presagios de León Prozak" (The Mysterious Presages of León Prozak) which premiered at the Annecy International Animated Film Festival. In the 2000's there was renewed activity in Colombian animation thanks to the interest of a new generation in this genre and the emergence of new technology. In 2003 the animated full-length film Bolivar the Hero was released, and the LOOP festival of animation and video games was born where the work of Colombian and Latin American animators was encouraged and rewarded.

Film festivals 
Many film festivals take place in Colombia, but arguably the two most important are the Cartagena Film Festival, functioning every year since 1960, and the Bogotá Film Festival, functioning every year since 1984 and presenting Latin American and Spanish movies.

Other competitions 
Asides from both international festivals, year-round there are encounters, expositions and festivals that gather audiences and award local film makers. The most notable are as follows:
Cien miradas, un país: "A Hundred Eyes, A Country", is a Colombian film festival that takes place every year in Colombia and in several European cities. The event is organized by the Foundation for the Development of Audiovisual Arts "Fundaudiovisuales".
Eurocine: competition held every year since 1995 in which European films are shown when they are not made available through commercial distribution, the event is organized by the Bogotá offices of the Goethe-Institut, the European commission's delegation in ant the Cinemateca distrital de Bogotá.
Festival de cine francés: is an exposition of the best of French cinema held every year since 2001 on September and has the backing of the French embassy in Bogotá, Medellín, Cali and Barranquilla. It includes conferences, workshops and roundtables.
Semana de Cine Colombiano, Sí Futuro: stemming from growth in Colombian film making after the passing of the Law of Cinema, in 2006 an exposition of Colombian cinema was inaugurated with the awarding of noteworthy films, filmmakers and actors by an international jury.
The best films are selected and awarded by a specialized jury. The event is organized by Black Velvet Laboratories, a company dedicated to the field of "audiovisual entertainment analysis and development".
Festival de Cine y Video de Santa Fe de Antioquia: a festival that has been taking place since March 2000 by the Film and Video Corporation of de Santa Fe de Antioquia and organized by film maker Víctor Gaviria, with the stated aim of promoting film making and audience forming on the Antioquia region. However, film makers from all over the country can participate.
MUDA Colombia: The University Exposition of Audiovisuals (MUDA, for its Spanish abbreviation) Colombia is a contest held yearly where the best in university work is awarded as well as pedagogic techniques proposed by film professors all over the country.
IN VITRO VISUAL: One of the best established short-film-related events in Colombia, this event presents Colombian shorts on Tuesdays and foreign ones on Thursdays. Films are chosen through a yearly contest presided by a jury of veteran film makers. At the end of the event awards are given out along with the event's official statuettes (SANTA LUCIA) as well as cash prizes. This event is organized by Black Velvet Laboratories and In Vitro Producciones.
 LOOP, Festival Latinoamericano de Animación & Videojuegos: an animation festival with an emphasis on digital work that seeks to motivate young artists. The festival's website has developed into a community which encourages the learning and sharing of works.
 CineToro Film Festival: an emerging event dedicated to promoting experimental and independent films. It's an annual festival and has gained much attention for having a strong program of rare films and remarkable international guests.

Shows and distribution 
In Colombia there are four major commercial movie theatre chains: Cine Colombia, Cinepolis, Cinemark, Procinal and Royal Films. There are also many independent movie theaters, such as the Cinemateca Distrital de Bogotá and Los Acevedos in the Museo de Arte Moderno de Bogotá.

Openings in Colombia

Highest-grossing Colombian films

See also 

 Cinema of the world
 List of Colombian films
 Cartagena Film Festival

References

External links 

 Fundación Patrimonio Filmico Colombiano
 Fondo Mixto de Promoción Cinematográfica PROIMAGENES en Movimiento 
 Cinemateca Distrital de Bogotá
 Movie Theater of Los Acevedo in the Museum of Modern Arts of MAMBO
 Law of Cinema
 Cartagena Film Festival
 Bogotá Film Festival

 
Colombian culture
Articles containing video clips